Summertown  may refer to:

Places
 Summertown, Georgia, U.S.
 Summertown, Oxford, England
 Summertown, South Australia
 Summertown, Tennessee, U.S.

Other uses
 Summertown (album), by Deborah Conway and Willy Zygier, 2004

See also 

 Summerstown (disambiguation)
 Somerstown, Hampshire
 Somerton (disambiguation)